Mathias Abel (born 22 June 1981) is a German retired footballer who played as a defender.

Football career
Abel was born in Kaiserslautern, Rhineland-Palatinate. After starting with amateurs Eintracht Bad Kreuznach and having a spell with Borussia Dortmund's reserves, he joined 1. FSV Mainz 05 in 2002, helping the club promote from the second division in his second year with 18 matches.

Abel made his Bundesliga debut on 14 August 2004, in a 2–1 home win over Hamburger SV. He scored three goals during the season, as his team maintained its status.

From 2006 onwards, Abel would appear sparingly for several clubs: FC Schalke 04 – which also loaned him for five months to Hamburg – and 1. FC Kaiserslautern, appearing almost exclusively for the latter's B-side during two years. This was mainly due to two consecutive anterior cruciate ligament injuries (in early 2004, he suffered the same injury while at Mainz, being sidelined for six months).

Abel's first appearance for Kaiserslautern's first team only took place on 26 October 2010, as an early substitute in a 3–0 home win against Arminia Bielefeld for the campaign's German Cup. Four days later, he managed to play the full 90 minutes in the league fixture against Borussia Mönchengladbach (same venue and result).

In February 2013 Abel was linked with China League One team Beijing Baxy FC, but nothing came of it. After his contract with Lautern expired in the summer, he went on trial with Brunei DPMM FC of the S.League.

References

External links

1981 births
Living people
People from Kaiserslautern
German footballers
Association football defenders
Bundesliga players
2. Bundesliga players
Borussia Dortmund II players
1. FSV Mainz 05 players
FC Schalke 04 players
Hamburger SV players
1. FC Kaiserslautern players
1. FC Kaiserslautern II players
Footballers from Rhineland-Palatinate
21st-century German people